Vorgrimler is a German surname. Notable people with the surname include:

 Herbert Vorgrimler (1929–2014), German Roman Catholic theologian and writer
 Ludwig Vorgrimler (1912–1983), German firearm designer

German-language surnames
Surnames of German origin